Trans Air Benin — national air transport company, operating regular and irregular passenger.

History
Trans Air Bénin was founded in November 2000. Operated a leased Boeing 737-200, the carrier initiates twice-weekly roundtrips on November 17 from Cotonou to Ouagadougou, Burkina Faso, via Niamey, Niger. 
Trans Air Benin is on the list of air carriers banned from operating within the European Union.

Destinations

Domestic
 Natitingou
 Parakou

International
 Abidjan, Côte d'Ivoire
 Bamako, Mali
 Brazzaville, Republic of Congo
 Dakar, Senegal
 Lomé, Togo
 Pointe-Noire, Republic of Congo

Fleet
 1 - Antonov An-24
 1 - Boeing 727
 1 - DHC-6 Twin Otters
 1 - Let L-410 Turbolet

See also		
 List of defunct airlines of Benin

References

External links

Defunct airlines of Benin
Airlines established in 2000
2000 establishments in Benin